Dr. M. N. Singaramma (1920–2006) was a scholar, writer and social activist from Mandya in Karnataka, Southern India. She wrote many philosophical books and articles under the pen name Sridevi.

Her love for Hindi, despite having been born and brought up in Southern India earned her a lot of respect and admiration. She is still remembered by scholars working on philosophical and religious texts as a pathbreaker during times when there was no one doing any research on these subjects.

Educational qualifications 
 Doctorate in literature (Vidyasagar D.Lit) from Vikramshila Hindi Vidyapeeth, Bagalpur, Bihar
 Sahitya Ratna in Hindi, Sanskrit and Kannada from Prayag Vishwa Vidyalaya, Hindi Sahitya Sammelan, Allahabad.
 ‘Mahamahopadhyaya’ in research work on Indian Philosophy from Prayag Vishwa Vidyalaya, Allahabad.
 Praveen in Hindi from Dakshina Bharatha Hindi Prachar Sabha, Madras.

Publications 
 From 1948 to 1984 she wrote over 80 articles in Hindi, Kannada and Tamil on social, philosophical and religious themes.
 She has over 20 books published in Hindi, Kannada and Tamil on religious and philosophical subjects to her credit.
 Her Research papers have been published in Journals and magazines in Hindi, Kannada and Tamil.
 Her well-known books dealing with aspects of South Indian Philosophy like 'Vysnava Bhakti' published in Kannada, ‘Ramanuja Darshana’, ‘Pansharatra Mathhu Itara Agamagalu’, ‘Gopurada Hirime’ have been widely read and acclaimed and part of many libraries in India and abroad.
 She presented many papers and reports at seminars and conferences on South Indian Philosophy and Religion.

Awards 
 Listing in Reference Asia – Who is Who of Men and Women of Achievement in 2000
 Letter of Appreciation by former President of USA – Mr. Bill Clinton in May 2000 for the book ‘Philosophy of Pancharatra’
 Awarded the Mahatma Gandhi Hindi Award – 1992 by the Bangalore University Hindi Department for the book ‘Bhakti Siddhanjana’
 Title ‘Vidyavichakshana’ and Silver Shield from Vedavedanta Vyjayanti Vidyalaya, Kancheepuram, Tamil Nadu in 1971.
 Honoured by Mandya District Brahmana Sabha in 1987 and 2002
 Certificate of Appreciation by the Mandya Deputy Commissioner in 2001
 Central Government Fellowship for Literary Scholars since 1987
 Honoured by the Government of Karnataka during Rajyotsava in 1985-86
 Government of Karnataka Honorarium for Literary Scholars since 1982
 Scholarship from Ubhaya Vedanta Sabha, Bangalore
 ‘Swarnajayanti 12’ from Dakshina Bharatha Hindi Prachar Sabha in 1981
 Honoured by Mahila Sahitya Sammelana, Mandya
 National award in Literature and Culture Fellowship in 1983 for work titled ‘Bhakti Siddhanjana’ in Hindi
 Jamunalal Bajaj Award in 1964
 Numerous certificates from prominent scholars, Mathadhipatis, professors and other eminent men in recognition of work on South Indian Philosophy & religion.

Research work 
 Research work in Hindi and Kannada Literature since 1968
 Research work in South Indian Philosophy and Religion
 Research work in various Indian languages- Kannada, Tamil, Telugu and Sansjrit
 Research work for the Bibliography project of Sanskrit Research Institute, Melkote for 2 years (1980–1982)
 Research work under the guidance of eminent scholars like Shri. Vellukudy Varadachar Swamy, Nyaya Vedanta Vidvan Karpankad Venkatachariar Swamy, Late P.B.Annagarachar Swamy.

Social work 
 Singaramma worked as District Organizer of Zilla Hindi Samiti, Mandya during 1961-71 and District Secretary of Zilla Hindi Prachara Samiti. She participated in the Third Hindi Sammelan at Delhi in 1983.
 She worked for Kannada Sahitya Parishad, Bangalore as Member for 20 years and conducted lectures and articles during the Women's Year.
 She established ‘Hindi Kannada Vidyalaya’ at Mandya and conducted classes for women in Hindi and Kannada for over 30 years.
 She was the Honorary Secretary working committee member and member of Mahila Samaja for over 25 years. She conducted music classes, coaching classes in Hindi, Crafts and tailoring classes for women, condensed course for women in matriculation.

She primarily worked for educating and uplifting of women's status and enabling them to independently earn a living.

References 
 1
 2
 3

Gallery 

20th-century Indian essayists
20th-century Indian women writers
1920 births
2006 deaths
People from Mandya
Women writers from Karnataka
20th-century Indian philosophers
Indian women philosophers
Scholars from Karnataka
20th-century pseudonymous writers
Pseudonymous women writers